Ahmet Hisarlı (1908 – January 4, 1984), also known by the pen name Hisarlı Ahmet, was a Turkish ashik.

Life 
Born in the Yukarı Hisar neighborhood of Kütahya which was the centre of the old city. Spent his childhood and youth with his father. Learned to play trichord bağlama at "Gezeks" which young boys gather at, entertain and chat with each other. Learned to play clarinet at his military age and after he came back he moved to downtown. He opened a coffeehouse afterwards this coffeehouse been a place that all famous ashiks around the Anatolia came by. In here he taught to youngs how to play bağlama and sing.

Muzaffer Sarısözen invited him to TRT Ankara Radio Studios and proposed him to stay in Ankara but he refused. He changed his surname "İnegöllüoğlu" to "Hisarlı" which is used as a nickname.

On January 4, 1984, he died in Kütahya.

Selected works 
 Elif Dedim Be Dedim
 Kütahya'nın Pınarları Akışır
 Ben Kendimi Gülün Dibinde Buldum
 Feracemin Ucu Sırma
 Gar mı Yağdı Kütahya'nın Dağına
 Yağmur Yağar Her Dereler Sel Alır
 Hisardan İnmem Diyor (Menberi)
 Meşeden Gel A Sürmelim
 A İstanbul Sen Bir Han mısın
 Gidin Bulutlar Gidin
 Duman Vardır Güzel İzmir Başında
 Ah Hamamcı Bu Hamama Güzellerden Kim Gelir
 Altın Tas İçinde Kınam Ezdiler
 Portakalım Çaya Düştü
 Fincanın Dibi Noktalı
 Bedestene Vardım Şalvar İsterim
 Yasemen Dalına Yâr Neden Eğmeli
 Havada Durna Sesi Gelir
 Karanfil Oylum Oylum
 İki Bülbül Derelerde Ün Eder
 Depeköy Üstüne Tüfeng Asayım
 İğnem Düştü Yerlere
 Aydın Meşeleri Dalleri Yerde
 Çatal Çam Başına Goydum Keseri
 Mustafa'm Kaşların Kare
 Söğüt Dallerinde Beslenen Bülbül
 Şu Karşıki Dağda Bir Kuzu Meler
 Leyla'm Zülüflerin Çengeldir Çengel
 Gara Goyun Goyunların Beyidir
 Sıyırdılar Serpuşumu Başımdan
 Eremedim Vefasına Dünyanın
 Aya Bak Yıldıza Bak
 Merhaba
 Elveda
 Sabah Salası

References 

1908 births
20th-century Turkish male musicians
1984 deaths
Ashiks